Consequences is a 1918 British silent comedy film directed by Arthur Rooke and starring Gordon Craig, Joyce Templeton and J. Hastings Batson. The screenplay was written by Kenelm Foss.

Partial cast
 Gordon Craig as Bobbie
 Joyce Templeton as Joyce
 J. Hastings Batson as Guardian

External links

1918 films
1918 comedy films
British silent short films
British comedy films
Films directed by Arthur Rooke
British black-and-white films
1910s English-language films
1910s British films
Silent comedy films